This is a list of failed launches of rockets in the Thor and Delta rocket family.

The Thor and Delta family rockets have had 51 complete failures, 10 partial failures, and 1 partial success, for a total of 62 unsuccessful Thor and Delta family missions. Since it has had 768 launches, this gives it a reliability of 91.9%, which puts it within the average range for rockets that started around the space age.

Launch attempts

References 

Lists of rocket launches